Bombón de Azúcar is the first album by the Puerto Rican rock band La Secta AllStar, released in 1999. The title song, written by the lead singer Gustavo Laureano, was previously released by Ricky Martin.

The album was re-released in 2007 with new cover art.

Track listing

Original 1999 release

2007 re-release 
 "Bombón De Azúcar" - 4:55
 "Aniquila" - 4:11
 "Recompensa" - 3:59
 "Papa's Shake" - 4:39
 "Nunca Jamás" - 5:43
 "La Vida No Es Tan Mala, Na'" - 4:11
 "Luna De Día" - 4:50
 "Mar Y Marea" - 5:03
 "Se Acabó" - 6:17
 "Caido" - 5:29
 "Chica Ideal" - 6:05
 "Bombón De Azúcar" - 4:56

1999 albums
La Secta AllStar albums